Whirling Udumbara II ( 优昙波罗旋转舞 II ) is a work for He-drum and string orchestra,
composed by He Xuntian in 2012.

Summary
Whirling Udumbara II  (2012) was written especially for string orchestra and He-drum. He-drum was created and designed by Mr. He. The distinctive sound and the performance method of He-drum make a deep impression. 
The Soloist of this Works is the first worldwide He-drum performer Ehesuma.

Inspiration

Whirling Udumbara II was inspired from Xuntian He's poem Fragrant Nirvana Tree (1999).

First performance
8. November 2014 Shanghai, Concert Hall, Oriental Art Center (CN) 
He-drum: Ehesuma 
Dirigent: James Judd 
Israel Symphony Orchestra

References

External links
Whirling Udumbara II published by Schott Music International, Germany

Compositions by He Xuntian
Percussion music
Compositions for string orchestra
2012 compositions